Allium bolanderi is a species of wild onion known by the common name Bolander's onion. It is native to northern California and southwestern Oregon, where it grows in the rocky soils of the Klamath Mountains and surrounding regions.

The inflorescence contains 10 to 20 reddish-purple, or occasionally white, flowers, each with very finely toothed tepals.

Two varieties are recognized:

Allium bolanderi var. bolanderi
Allium bolanderi var. mirabile (L.F.Hend.) McNeal

References

bolanderi
Flora of California
Flora of Oregon
Flora of the Klamath Mountains
Onions
Plants described in 1879
Taxa named by Sereno Watson
Flora without expected TNC conservation status